Green City station is a historic train station located at Green City, Sullivan County, Missouri.  It was built about 1880 by the Quincy, Missouri, and Pacific Railroad.  It is a 1 1/2-story, rectangular frame building with Stick style design elements.  The gable roofed building features a central three sided hipped dormer that projects over a projecting bay window.  The depot remained in operation until 1950.

It was listed on the National Register of Historic Places in 1999 as the Green City Railroad Depot.

References

Railway stations on the National Register of Historic Places in Missouri
Queen Anne architecture in Missouri
Railway stations in the United States opened in 1880
Former Chicago, Burlington and Quincy Railroad stations
National Register of Historic Places in Sullivan County, Missouri
Former railway stations in Missouri